Wrisley Brown (1883-1943) was Washington, DC lawyer and a soldier.

Biography
In 1911 he served as a special assistant to George W. Wickersham, the United States Attorney General. He ran the investigation that led to the impeachment of Judge Robert W. Archbald of the United States Commerce Court on June 12, 1912.

References

1883 births
1943 deaths
Place of birth missing
Place of death missing